V. nivea may refer to:
 Valsa nivea, a plant pathogen species
 Veronica nivea, the milfoil speedwell or snow speedwell, a flowering plant species

See also 
 Nivea (disambiguation)